There are 165 scheduled monuments in Bristol, England. These protected sites date from the Neolithic period and include barrows, a  historic shipyard, ancient Roman sites, castle ruins, a Jewish burial structure, bridges, and lighthouses.
In the United Kingdom, the scheduling of monuments was first initiated to insure the preservation of "nationally important" archaeological sites or historic buildings. The protection given to scheduled monuments is given under the Ancient Monuments and Archaeological Areas Act 1979

Notable scheduled monuments in Bristol

See also
Grade I listed buildings in Bristol
History of Bristol
List of scheduled monuments

References

Scheduled monuments in Bristol